The 2018 Liga Profesional de Primera División season, also known as the Campeonato Uruguayo 2018, was the 115th season of Uruguay's top-flight football league, and the 88th in which it is professional. The season was named as "Ing. Julio César Franzini" and began on 3 February, ending on 11 November. Peñarol were the defending champions, and successfully defended the title with a 2–1 win over Nacional in the championship playoff.

Format
The format in this season was the same as the most recent season, with the Torneo Apertura in the first half of the year and the Torneo Clausura in the second half, and a Torneo Intermedio played between both tournaments.

Teams

The two bottom-placed teams in the relegation table of the 2017 season, Juventud and Plaza Colonia, as well as Sud América, who lost a tiebreaker to El Tanque Sisley, were relegated to the Segunda División for the 2018 season. They were replaced by Torque, Atenas, and Progreso, who were promoted from the Segunda División.

On 2 February 2018, the Uruguayan Football Association confirmed that El Tanque Sisley would not take part in the league due to an outstanding debt. As a result, El Tanque Sisley were administratively relegated to the second tier for the 2019 season and the season was played by 15 teams.

a: Boston River is based in Montevideo but plays its home games at Estadio Parque Artigas in Las Piedras.
b: El Tanque Sisley is based in Montevideo but plays its home games at Estadio Campeones Olímpicos in Florida.
c: Torque is based in Montevideo but plays its home games at Estadio Municipal Casto Martínez Laguarda in San José de Mayo. They played their first five home games at Estadio José Nasazzi in Montevideo.

Managerial changes

Torneo Apertura
The Torneo Apertura, named "Sr. Abdón Porte", was the first tournament of the 2018 season. It began on 3 February and ended on 6 May. With El Tanque Sisley being unable to take part in the season, all teams were awarded three points in their matches against El Tanque Sisley, with no goals for being counted.

Standings

Results

Top goalscorers

Source: Soccerway

Torneo Intermedio
The Torneo Intermedio, named "Sr. Juan Carlos Bugallo" was the second tournament of the 2018 season, played between the Apertura and Clausura tournaments. It consisted of two groups whose composition depended on the final standings of the Torneo Apertura: teams in odd-numbered positions played in Serie A, and teams in even-numbered positions played in Serie B. Given the absence of El Tanque Sisley for this season, Serie A had the usual eight teams while Serie B was contested by seven teams. It started on 9 May and ended on 10 June, with the winners being granted a berth into the 2019 Copa Sudamericana and the 2019 Supercopa Uruguaya.

Serie A

Serie B

Torneo Intermedio Final

Top goalscorers

Source: Soccerway

Torneo Clausura
The Torneo Clausura, named "Cr. Hugo Sebastiani", was the third tournament of the 2018 season. It began on 21 July and ended on 4 November. As happened in the Torneo Apertura, all teams were awarded three points in their matches against El Tanque Sisley, with no goals for being counted.

Standings

Results

Top goalscorers

Source: Soccerway

Aggregate table
The aggregate table includes the results of the three stages played throughout the season (Torneo Apertura, Torneo Intermedio, and Torneo Clausura). Since El Tanque Sisley did not compete (which caused the Torneo Intermedio to have groups of different size), the points earned by the teams in the smaller group of the Torneo Intermedio were weighted for the purposes of elaborating the aggregate table: teams in Serie B had their points divided between the number of games they played (6) and then multiplied by the number of games played by teams in Serie A (7), in order to get the points earned in the Torneo Intermedio to the effects of the aggregate table.

Championship playoff

Semi-final

Final
Since Peñarol, who had the best record in the aggregate table, won the semifinal, they became champions automatically and the final was not played. Nacional became runners-up as the second-placed team in the aggregate table. Both teams qualified for the 2019 Copa Libertadores group stage.

Relegation
Relegation was determined at the end of the season by computing an average of the number of points earned per game over the two most recent seasons: 2017 and 2018. El Tanque Sisley was one of the teams relegated to the Segunda División for the following season, as well as the two teams with the lowest average.

References

External links
Asociación Uruguaya de Fútbol - Campeonato Uruguayo 

2018
1
2018 in South American football leagues